Inquisitor shibanoi is an extinct species of sea snail, a marine gastropod mollusk in the family Pseudomelatomidae, the turrids and allies.

Description
The length of the shell reaches a length of 14 mm, and a diameter 5 mm.

Distribution
Fossils of this marine species were found in the Higashi-Innai Formation in Japan.

References

External links
  MASUDA, KOICHIRO. "516. MOLLUSCAN FAUNA OF THE HIGASHI-INNAI FORMATION OF NOTO PENINSULA, JAPAN-III; DESCRIPTION OF NEW SPECIES AND REMARKS ON SOME SPECIES." Transactions and proceedings of the Paleontological Society of Japan. New series. Vol. 1967. No. 65. PALAEONTOLOGICAL SOCIETY OF JAPAN, 1967.

shibanoi
Gastropods described in 1967